Don Ward is the name of:

 Don Ward (comedian), British comedy entrepreneur and producer
 Don Ward (cricketer) (born 1934), former cricketer
 Don Ward (ice hockey) (1935–2014), Canadian ice hockey defenceman